Charles Averill Barlow (March 17, 1858 – October 3, 1927) was an American farmer, businessman and politician.  He was most notable for his service as a member of the California State Assembly and a member of the U.S. representative from California's 6th congressional district.

Early life 
Barlow was born in Cleveland, Ohio on March 17, 1858, the son of Merrill Barlow and Ann Frances (Arnold) Barlow.  The Barlow family, including Barlow's three brothers and sisters, moved to Ventura, California in 1875.  Barlow was educated in the public schools of Cleveland and Ventura, and after completing his education he supported himself by working as a harness maker and farm laborer.

Career 
Barlow became a businessman. He purchased an interest in his employer's harness making business, and then invested in other ventures, including a business drying and shipping fruit grown in California.

Barlow moved to San Luis Obispo in the early 1880s, where he grew wheat and with a partner began a weekly newspaper, the Reasoner.  He became interested in reform causes including the Free Silver movement that led him to join the Populist Party, and the Reasoner became a major pro-Populist outlet.

Barlow was elected to the California State Assembly as a Populist, and served one term, 1892 to 1893.  He served as chairman of the People's Party state convention in 1896.  Later that year, Barlow was elected to the 55th Congress, and he served one term, March 4, 1897, to March 3, 1899.  He was not a candidate for renomination in 1898.

After leaving Congress, Barlow turned his attention to business and moved to Bakersfield.  He was one of the major shareholders in and a board of directors member of Bakersfield's Security Trust Company.  He was also a partner in Barlow & Hill, a company that dealt in land for oil exploration, and helped found several successful oil companies, some of which they continued to operate, and some of which they sold to other investors.

Barlow served as president of the Kern County Board of Trade and was active in several civic organizations, including Modern Woodmen, Elks, and Odd Fellows.  He joined the Democratic Party after the end of the Populist movement, and served as a delegate to the 1912 and 1920 Democratic National Conventions.

Personal life 
Barlow's wife was Elizabeth "Lizzie" McDonnell (1867-1914) of Ventura.

After the death of Barlow's first wife, he married Julia Lillis Caldwell (1878-1971) of Santa Rosa, his wife's nurse. They adopted a daughter, Mamie.

On October 3, 1927, Barlow died in Bakersfield, California. Barlow is interred at Union Cemetery in Bakersfield, California.

References

Additional sources

Books

Newspapers

External links

 Extended biography of Charles A. Barlow
 Join California Charles A. Barlow

1858 births
1927 deaths
California Populists
County supervisors in California
Democratic Party members of the California State Assembly
Politicians from Cleveland
People from San Luis Obispo, California
People's Party members of the United States House of Representatives from California
19th-century American politicians
Democratic Party members of the United States House of Representatives from California